The Swimming Union of the Americas organizes Pan American Championships for the sport of artistic swimming (formerly, synchronized swimming). These are considered the official continental championships for the Americas (comprising North America, South America, Central America and the Caribbean).

Senior editions

All-time medal table

See also 
 Artistic swimming at the Pan American Games

References 

International sports championships in the Americas
Synchronised swimming competitions
Synchronized swimming in North America
Synchronised swimming in South America